General elections were held in Uruguay on 26 November 1950, alongside a constitutional referendum. The result was a victory for the Colorado Party, which won the most seats in the Chamber of Deputies and received the most votes in the presidential election.

Results
Under the electoral system in place at the time, each political party could have as many as three presidential candidates.  The combined result of the votes for a party's candidates determined which party would control the executive branch, and whichever of the winning party's candidates finished in first place would be declared President.

References

External links
Politics Data Bank at the Social Sciences School – Universidad de la República (Uruguay)

Elections in Uruguay
Uruguay
General
Uruguay
Election and referendum articles with incomplete results